Superior to the anterior portion of the trochlea is a small depression, the coronoid fossa, which receives the coronoid process of the ulna during flexion of the forearm. It is directly adjacent to the radial fossa of the humerus.

Additional images

References

External links
 

Humerus